The Princess Mound is a historic site near Green Cove Springs, Florida. It is located on Fleming Island, northwest of Green Cove Springs. On March 2, 1990, it was added to the U.S. National Register of Historic Places.

References

External links
 Clay County listings at National Register of Historic Places
 Clay County listings at Florida's Office of Cultural and Historical Programs
 Digging through red tape at Jacksonville Business Journal

See also
 List of burial mounds in the United States

Archaeological sites in Florida
National Register of Historic Places in Clay County, Florida
Mounds in Florida